Isley cum Langley is a civil parish in the North West Leicestershire district of Leicestershire, England. According to the 2001 census it had a population of 64. At the 2011 census the population of the civil parish remained less than 100 and is included in the civil parish of Breedon on the Hill.

References 

Civil parishes in Leicestershire
North West Leicestershire District